New Zealand competed at the 1936 Summer Olympics in Berlin, Germany. Seven competitors, all men, took part in nine events in three sports. Late in the process, Arthur Porritt was appointed manager of the New Zealand team.

Medallists

Competitors
The following table lists the number of New Zealand competitors participating at the Games according to gender and sport.

Athletics

Boxing

Cycling

One male cyclist represented New Zealand in 1936.

Road

Track
Men's sprint

 Men's 1 km time trial

References

External links
Official Olympic Reports
International Olympic Committee results database

Nations at the 1936 Summer Olympics
1936
Summer Olympics